Princeton Record Exchange, located at 20 South Tulane St. in Princeton, New Jersey, is an independent record store. PREX (as it is often referred to) was founded in 1980 by Barry Weisfeld. He had spent five years, beginning in 1975, selling used records from his van at flea markets and college campuses, and wanted to settle in one location. Princeton seemed ideal because of its central location on the east coast. The store opened in 1980 at 20 Nassau St, and moved to its current larger location in 1985.

In 2015, founder Barry Weisfeld, an accomplished shuttlecock player, sold the store to longtime manager Jon Lambert.  Weisfeld will continue to serve as a consultant and as coordinator of purchases of large music collections.

The store spans  and houses 150,000 titles; one of the largest selections of any independent music store in the Northeast.

In spite of the growing competition that the internet has bred, the store maintains profitability by purchasing   used CDs, used DVDs and used LPs for resale. In contrast with most other internet business models, they do not sell music or movies online, but they do purchase many collections online.

They have also utilized social media to engage their customers with a popular Facebook page and a YouTube channel which features store tours and shows videos of newly arrived collections.

Positive publicity in leading music journals has also contributed to their ongoing success. The New York Times is quoted as saying, "Customers come from as far as Scotland and Japan or as close as around the corner. Since 1980, the Record Exchange here has flourished ..."

Billboard has added, "With both bargain hunters and serious collectors, the Princeton Record Exchange has established a secure niche for itself." And major music groups have contributed, as LCD Soundsystem is quoted in Wire, "...if it wasn't for the Princeton Record Exchange, I might as well have grown up in the armpit of the world...The Record Exchange saved my life."

While the store offers an extensive selection of mainstream categories like rock, alternative, hip hop, and punk, it also features a selection of over 15,000 classical CDs and jazz CDs. In addition to music, Princeton Record Exchange also carries over 10,000 DVDs. The store employed Mickey Melchiondo (Dean Ween) of Ween before the band's rise to fame.

In popular culture
 In the episode "DNR" of the television series House, which takes place in Princeton & Plainsboro, a supporting character is seen entering the elevator holding a bag full of CDs from Princeton Record Exchange.
 Noted New Jersey Hip Hop producer Tony D has also made reference to the Princeton Record Exchange in several songs and interviews. Tony D once alleged that Pete Rock purchased Tom Scott's "Today" at the Princeton Record Exchange and later sampled the song for the hit single "They Reminisce Over You (T.R.O.Y.)", according to an interview with DJ PrimeTime on Princeton Radio.

References

External links
Princeton Record Exchange Official Web Site 
 Facebook page
  Instagram

Princeton, New Jersey
Music retailers of the United States
Independent stores
1980 establishments in New Jersey
Retail companies established in 1980
American companies established in 1980